The discography of Australian musician, singer and songwriter Courtney Barnett consists of three studio albums, one collaborative album, one live album, three extended plays, twenty-two singles and fourteen music videos. Barnett's debut studio album, Sometimes I Sit and Think, and Sometimes I Just Sit (2015), was certified Gold by the Australian Recording Industry Association (ARIA), and won her the awards for Best Female Artist and Breakthrough Artist – Release at the 2015 ARIA Awards.

Albums

Studio albums

Collaborative albums

Live albums

Extended plays

Singles

Other charted songs

Music videos

Notes

References

External links
 

Discographies of Australian artists
Alternative rock discographies